Shazia Khushk (Sindhi: شازيه خشڪ) (born September 1970 in Jamshoro), is a Pakistani former folk singer. She sung in Sindhi, Balochi,  Sairaiki, Urdu, Kashmiri, Brahui and  Punjabi.

Biography
Shazia Khushk was born at Jamshoro. She debuted for a show in 1992, upon her husband's encouragement, about whom Shazia says, "My husband often called me the Queen of Voice". She emerged as a singer of two prominent languages Sindhi and Balochi. Her debut song Mara Udheta Pakhiyara Kadi Aao Na Maare Des popularized her name across the country.

Legacy
Shazia Khushk performed over 500 songs in the span of her career, performing in 45 countries around the world. US Consulate General, Karachi had selected Shazia as the 'goodwill ambassador'. 
Sindh University, Jamshoro conferred upon her, an honorary fellowship for 'Sufism - folk music'. 
She received 'presidential award' from the government of Uzbekistan

Awards 

 Shazia Khushk received an honorary fellowship in Sufism and folk music from the University of Sindh.
 Uzbekistan government awarded her a Presidential Award in appreciation of her singing.

Quit Singing 
In 2019, Shahzia Khushk announced that she has decided to part ways with the music industry. And she will spend her rest of the life in the service of Islam.

Songs
Some of her famous songs are:
 Roobaro-e-Yaar
 Tera Naam Liya
 Laal Meri Pat Rakhyo لعل میری پت رکھیو
 Niaani Nimaani
Medha Ranjana میڈھا رانجھنا
 Mada udtha Pakhiya ke Ao Na Mare Desh
 Aley Muhinja Maaraora

https://lyricskaashi.blogspot.com/

See also 
 Sindhi music
 List of Sindhi singers

References 

Sindhi people
People from Jamshoro District
Pakistani folk singers
1970 births
Living people
Punjabi singers
Sindhi-language singers
Singers from Sindh
Pakistani Muslims